Lynn Township is a township in McLeod County, Minnesota, United States. The population was 604 at the 2000 census.

History
According to Warren Upham, Lynn Township may be named after Lynn, Massachusetts.

Geography
According to the United States Census Bureau, the township has a total area of 33.1 square miles (85.8 km2), of which 31.8 square miles (82.3 km2)  is land and 1.4 square miles (3.5 km2)  (4.10%) is water.

Demographics
As of the census of 2000, there were 604 people, 216 households, and 174 families residing in the township.  The population density was 19.0 people per square mile (7.3/km2). There were 226 housing units at an average density of 7.1/sq mi (2.7/km2). The racial makeup of the township was 99.01% White, 0.17% Asian, 0.33% from other races, and 0.50% from two or more races. Hispanic or Latino of any race were 0.50% of the population.

There were 216 households, out of which 35.2% had children under the age of 18 living with them, 70.8% were married couples living together, 3.2% had a female householder with no husband present, and 19.4% were non-families. 18.5% of all households were made up of individuals, and 10.2% had someone living alone who was 65 years of age or older. The average household size was 2.80 and the average family size was 3.19.

In the township the population was spread out, with 30.0% under the age of 18, 5.1% from 18 to 24, 25.8% from 25 to 44, 25.8% from 45 to 64, and 13.2% who were 65 years of age or older. The median age was 39 years. For every 100 females, there were 111.9 males. For every 100 females age 18 and over, there were 108.4 males.

The median income for a household in the township was $51,250, and the median income for a family was $55,972. Males had a median income of $30,521 versus $26,146 for females. The per capita income for the township was $19,699.  About 4.0% of families and 5.9% of the population were below the poverty line, including 8.4% of those under age 18 and 14.5% of those age 65 or over.

References

Townships in McLeod County, Minnesota
Townships in Minnesota